Edgar Moreau (born 3 April 1994) is a French classical cellist.

Biography 
Moreau was born in Paris on 3 April 1994. After following the teaching of Xavier Gagnepain, he continued his studies at the Conservatoire de Paris in the class of Philippe Muller in cello and Claire Désert for chamber music.

At the age of 15, he won the Young Soloist Prize at the Concours de violoncelle Rostropovitch and at 17, the second prize of the International Tchaikovsky Competition. In 2013 he signed an exclusive contract with  Erato, and his first recording, a recital of pieces for cello and piano with Pierre-Yves Hodique, was published in 2014. Révélation soliste instrumental de l'année at the Victoires de la musique classique 2013, he was Soliste instrumental de l'année at the 2015 edition.

On 27 November 2015, he played the sarabande of the 2nd suite by Johann Sebastian Bach during the ceremony held at Les Invalides in tribute to the victims of the November 2015 Paris attacks.

Discography 
 Pieces for cello and piano by Elgar, Paganini, Fauré, Dvorák, Poulenc, Tchaikovsky, Massenet, Popper, Gluck... - with Pierre-Yves Hodique. Erato, 2014
 Le Roi qui n'aimait pas la musique  by Karol Beffa, with Renaud Capuçon (violin), Paul Meyer (clarinet) and Karol Beffa (piano), CD-book Gallimard jeunesse, 2017
 A Family Affair (music by Dvořák and Korngold) with sibings Raphäelle and David (violins), and Jérémie (piano), 2020

References

External links 
 Biographie lauréat de la Fondation d’entreprise Groupe Banque Populaire  Edgar Moreau, violoncelliste
 Website of the Adami Révélations classiques 2012
 Article in Ouest-France Edgar Moreau, le "Petit Prince" du violoncelle
 Biographie d'Edgar Moreau on Festival de musique de Menton
 Edgar MOREAU, violoncelle - Victoires de la Musique Classique - Danse des Elfes on YouTube

French classical cellists
1994 births
Musicians from Paris
Living people